Flight 892 may refer to:

 Garuda Indonesia Flight 892, which crashed on 28 May 1968, resulting in the casualties of all 29 on board as well as 1 on the ground due to all four engines failing
 Aeroflot Flight 892, which crashed on 12 December 1986, killing 72 of the 82 passengers on board due to a language misunderstanding

0892